The Battle of Ingalls was a gunfight on September 1, 1893 between United States Marshals and the Doolin-Dalton Gang, during the closing years of the Old West era, in Ingalls, Oklahoma. The Doolin-Dalton Gang had been involved in a number of train robberies and bank robberies, beginning around 1891. They had found a safe haven in the town of Ingalls, which unwittingly harbored many outlaws during that period. On September 1, 1893, a posse was organized by the new United States Marshal, Evett Dumas "E.D." Nix, which entered the outlaw town of Ingalls with the intent to capture the gang. The lawmen were engaged in a gunbattle in which three of the fourteen lawmen carrying Deputy Marshals' commissions would die as a result of the battle.

Battle
The gunbattle began when the US Marshals, led by Deputy Marshal John Hixon, engaged "Bittercreek" Newcomb, which resulted in a shootout exchange that left Newcomb badly wounded after firing, at the most, two rounds. By a first hand account given later by US Marshal Nix, a large number of the outlaws then opened fire from a saloon, resulting in the lawmen returning fire, killing one horse and firing in such a manner as to force the outlaws to flee out a side door of the saloon, taking refuge in a large stable. A civilian known only as Murray, who owned the saloon, then engaged the Marshals in a shootout from his saloon's front doorway, during which the marshals shot him in the ribs and arm. Murray was badly wounded and arrested. He pursued damages against the government two years later, but lost his case much thanks to US Marshal Nix staunchly defending his deputy marshals' actions.

From an extremely good and elevated angle, "Arkansas Tom" Jones then opened fire with a rifle. Having an advantage over the marshals, he was able to push them into points of cover, during which he shot Deputy Marshal Thomas Hueston. Hueston would die the next day. It had been Deputy Marshal Hueston who, on November 29, 1892, along with Ford County, Kansas Sheriff Chalkey Beeson had shot and killed Doolin Dalton gang member Oliver Yantis. Ingalls bystander Young Simmons was fatally shot by a stray round as he attempted to take cover inside Vaughn's Saloon. Another bystander, known as Old Man Ramson, was hit in the leg.

Bill Doolin, the co-leader of the gang, shot and killed Special Deputy Marshal Richard Speed, while co-leader Bill Dalton shot Deputy Marshal Lafayette Shadley, who died the following day. Shadley had fired on Dalton prior to himself being shot, breaking the leg of the outlaw's horse and toppling Dalton to the ground. Dan "Dynamite Dick" Clifton was then hit in the neck and wounded, but still able to ride. Deputy Marshal Jim Masterson eventually threw dynamite into where Jones was hiding, stunning him, after which he was captured.

Of the outlaws, "Bittercreek" Newcomb was seriously wounded but escaped, "Dynamite Dick" Clifton was slightly wounded but escaped, and "Arkansas Tom" Jones, who had shot at least one of the deputies and one citizen, was stunned by the dynamite and captured. The saloon owner, Murray, who had taken up arms and sided with the outlaws, survived, spent some time in prison and later sued the marshals over his being shot. The rest of the gang escaped unscathed. Gang member Charley Pierce, who escaped, was later said to have been wounded during that gunfight, and was known for a fact to have gone into hiding with Newcomb shortly after the gunbattle, at which time both men were cared for by Newcomb's girlfriend Rose Dunn.

Eventually, the gang was wiped out, some by capture, but most being killed by Deputy US Marshals. Most were brought down by the celebrated Three Guardsmen, Deputy Marshals Heck Thomas, Bill Tilghman and Chris Madsen. Two of the gang, "Bitter Creek" Newcomb and Charley Pierce, were killed by the Dunn Brothers, who were bounty hunters. The last of the gang to fall was Richard "Little Dick" West, killed in 1898 by Deputy Marshal Madsen. The actual last member to be killed was Roy Daugherty aka Arkansas Tom. He was killed in a shootout with Joplin, MO police August 16th, 1924.

References

External links
Doolin Dalton Gang vs US Marshals
Bill Doolin and his Wild Bunch Gang
Oklahoma Centennial on the Battle of Ingalls
Gunfight at Ingalls

American frontier
1893 in Oklahoma Territory
American Old West gunfights
September 1893 events